Chamanthedon is a genus of moths in the family Sesiidae.

Species
Chamanthedon albicincta  Hampson, 1919
Chamanthedon aurigera (Bryk, 1947)
Chamanthedon bicincta  Arita & Gorbunov, 2000
Chamanthedon chrysostetha (Diakonoff, [1968])
Chamanthedon flavipes (Hampson, 1893)
Chamanthedon hypochroma  Le Cerf, 1916
Chamanthedon melanoptera  Le Cerf, 1927
Chamanthedon quinquecincta (Hampson, [1893a])
Chamanthedon suisharyonis (Strand, [1917])
Chamanthedon xanthopleura  Le Cerf, 1916
Chamanthedon aurantiibasis (Rothschild, 1911)
Chamanthedon gaudens (Rothschild, 1911)
Chamanthedon amorpha  Hampson, 1919
Chamanthedon brillians (Beutenmüller, 1899)
Chamanthedon chalypsa  Hampson, 1919
Chamanthedon chrysopasta  Hampson, 1919
Chamanthedon elymais (Druce, 1899)
Chamanthedon fulvipes (Hampson, 1910)
Chamanthedon hilariformis (Walker, 1856)
Chamanthedon leucocera  Hampson, 1919
Chamanthedon leucopleura  Hampson, 1919
Chamanthedon ochracea (Walker, [1865])
Chamanthedon striata  Gaede, 1929
Chamanthedon tapeina  Hampson, 1919
Chamanthedon tropica (Beutenmüller, 1899)
Chamanthedon xanthopasta  Hampson, 1919

References

Sesiidae